Tsuen Wan West is an underground MTR station in Tsuen Wan, New Territories, Hong Kong. There is an emergency platform on the southern side of the station.

There is a large bus and minibus interchange above the station, connecting it with most residential areas, factories, as well as shopping centres in the area. However, during the early days of operation the station has had little passenger traffic. Only a small number of residents in a few nearby residential estates and workers from nearby factories use the station. However, with the opening of new developments in central Tsuen Wan such as the 80 storey Nina Tower, Vision City, and City Point, traffic has increased. Additional MTR property development on nearby lands such as City Point and Pavilion Bay has also commenced circa 2014. These projects should also bolster the station's ridership.

It should be noticed that although the station is in the same region as Tsuen Wan station, the two stations have different fares. For example, passengers have to pay HK$1.7-4.0 more if they are going to Hong Kong Island, although it is faster and more convenient. Only out-of-system interchange is available for the pair.

History 
The construction of the station was very complex. It required the diversion of some roads, the demolition of two factories, part of a nearby park, and the relocation of a ferry pier which originally occupied the site. The station was designed by Farrells. The waterfront promenade built along with the station's construction connected the two ends of Tsuen Wan, significantly improved the scenery of the area, and provides a leisure place for many residents of southern and western Tsuen Wan.

On 20 December 2003, Tsuen Wan West station opened to the public with the first phase of the KCR West Rail.

Hence, Tsuen Wan West is now an intermediate station on the Tuen Ma line.

Layout

Entrances/exits

 A1: Tsuen Wan West Station Public Transport Interchange
 A2: Clague Garden Estate
 B1: Belvedere Garden, Cable TV Tower
 B2: Station Carpark
 C1: Waterfront Walkway
 C2: OP Mall
 C3: Parc City
 C4: OP Mall
 C5: Waterfront Walkway 
 D: Tsuen Wan Pier 
 E1: Tsuen Wan West Station Public Transport Interchange
 E2: Hoi Kwai Road

References

External links

 "Tsuen Wan West station: design and construction", The Arup Journal, March 2006

MTR stations in the New Territories
West Rail line
Tuen Ma line
Tsuen Wan
Former Kowloon–Canton Railway stations
Railway stations in Hong Kong opened in 2003